Arthur Stuart Duncan-Jones (25 April 1879 – 19 January 1955) was an Anglican priest and author in the first half of the 20th century.

Arthur Duncan-Jones was the son of another priest, Duncan Llewellyn Davies Jones, curate of Willoughby, Lincolnshire. Educated at Pocklington School and Gonville and Caius College, Cambridge, he was ordained in 1912. He held the College living at Blofield from 1912 until 1915 when he became Rector of Louth. He held further incumbencies at St Mary's, Primrose Hill, and St Paul's, Knightsbridge, before being elevated to the Deanery at Chichester Cathedral in 1929. He held this post until his death on 19 January 1955.

He was father of the philosopher Austin Duncan-Jones and journalist Vincent Stuart Duncan-Jones, who served as General Secretary of the British Peace Committee (the British section of the World Peace Council) from 1950 to 1954, and went to Vienna in 1954 as part of the Secretariat of the World Peace Council.

Works
Ordered Liberty, 1917
Church Music, 1920
The Aumbry and Hanging Pyx, 1925.
Archbishop Laud, 1927
A Good Friday Service, 1928
Story of Chichester Cathedral, London: Raphael Tuck & Sons, 1933
The Struggle for Religious Freedom in Germany, 1938
From U-Boat to Concentration Camp, 1938
The Crooked Cross, 1940
The Soul of Czechoslovakia, 1941
Witness in the Post-War World, 1946
The Chichester Customary, 1948

References

External links
 
Bibliographic directory from Project Canterbury

1879 births
People educated at Pocklington School
Alumni of Gonville and Caius College, Cambridge
Deans of Chichester
1955 deaths